Dhaka Commerce College is a master's level college in Mirpur, Dhaka, Bangladesh. Established in 1989, it was the first college in Dhaka city to specialise in business studies. Students receive education both in Bangla and English medium. The main founder of this college is professor Kazi Nurul Islam Faruky. This college is also known as DCC. Dhaka Commerce College was awarded as the best private college in Bangladesh in 2019. The Higher Secondary course for Science also has been started at the 2019 - 2020 session.

History
When Dhaka Commerce College began, in 1989, it offered Higher Secondary Certificate (HSC) classes and pass level Bachelor of Commerce courses. Honours and master's courses under National University were added starting with the 1994–95 academic year. A four-year Bachelor of Business Administration (BBA) professional course was added in the 1997–98 session.

Academics
The college educates from HSC level to post graduate level. There are twelve departments in the college. Course offering includes the Higher Secondary course and a broad range of postgraduate courses in Accounting, Economics, English, Finance, Management, Marketing, Statistics and Bangla. Also, the BBA and the CSE course are added to the college.
On the 2019 - 2020 session, Dhaka Commerce College started a Higher Secondary course on Science.

Departments
There is a total of 18 departments in this college. Every department is decorated by well qualified and skilled teachers.   
 Department of Bengali
 Department of English
 Department of Accounting
 Department of Finance & Banking
 Department of Marketing
 Department of Management
 Department of Economics
 Department of Statistics
 Department of Social Studies
 Department of Business Administration
 Department of CSE (Computer Science & Engineering)
 Department of Science

Performance

After its founding, it soon became known for its strict rules and regulations. The students call it Dhaka Central Cell. From its beginning, it has been maintaining high-quality standards. It got the medal of the best college in two times 1996 and 2002.

Since it began, Dhaka Commerce College was placed in the top 10 colleges in the country in terms of HSC results. The National University (NU) listed Dhaka Commerce College in top five colleges as the best among 685 in the country for their outstanding performances. Dhaka Commerce College's results in the Dhaka Board for Higher Secondary Certificate level examinations are:

References

External links 
 

 
Universities and colleges in Dhaka
Colleges affiliated to National University, Bangladesh
Colleges in Dhaka District
Educational institutions established in 1989
Private colleges in Bangladesh
1989 establishments in Bangladesh